The Hughes–Clark House is a historic building in Fayette, Jefferson County, Mississippi.<

Location
It is located at 21 Poindexter Street in Fayette, Mississippi.

Overview
The architectural style is Greek Revival.

It has been listed on the National Register of Historic Places since August 3, 1987.

References

Houses on the National Register of Historic Places in Mississippi
Houses in Jefferson County, Mississippi
Greek Revival houses in Mississippi
National Register of Historic Places in Jefferson County, Mississippi